Eupithecia terrestrata is a moth in the family Geometridae. It is found in North America, including Arizona and New Mexico.

The wingspan is about 17 mm.

References

Moths described in 1944
terrestrata
Moths of North America